Pioner Truda is a rural locality (a settlement) in Novoilyinsky Selsoviet, Khabarsky District, Altai Krai, Russia. The population was 205 as of 2013. There are 3 streets.

Geography 
Pioner Truda is located near the Burla river, 40 km southwest of Khabary (the district's administrative centre) by road.

References 

Rural localities in Khabarsky District